The 2018–19 Coppa Italia, also known as TIM Cup for sponsorship reasons, was the 72nd edition of the national cup in Italian football.

Juventus were the four-time defending champions, but were eliminated by Atalanta in the quarter-finals.

Lazio won the competition by defeating Atalanta 2–0 in the final, winning their seventh title overall.

Participating teams

Serie A (20 teams)

Atalanta
Bologna
Cagliari
Chievo
Empoli
Fiorentina
Frosinone
Genoa
Internazionale
Juventus
Lazio
Milan
Napoli
Parma
Roma
Sampdoria
Sassuolo
SPAL
Torino
Udinese

Serie B (19 teams)

Ascoli
Benevento
Brescia
Carpi
Cittadella
Cosenza
Cremonese
Crotone
Foggia
Hellas Verona
Lecce
Livorno
Padova
Palermo
Perugia
Pescara
Salernitana
Spezia
Venezia

Serie C (30 teams)

AlbinoLeffe
Alessandria
Carrarese
Casertana
Catania
FeralpiSalò
Giana Erminio
Juve Stabia
Monopoli
Monza
Novara
Piacenza
Pisa
Pistoiese
Pontedera
Pordenone
Pro Vercelli
Renate
Rende
Sambenedettese
Sicula Leonzio
Siena
Südtirol
Ternana
Trapani
Triestina
Vicenza Virtus
Virtus Entella
Virtus Francavilla
Viterbese

Serie D (9 teams)

Albalonga
Campodarsego
Chieri
Como
Imolese
Matelica
Picerno
Rezzato
Unione Sanremo

Format and seeding
Teams entered the competition at various stages, as follows:
 First phase (one-legged fixtures)
 First round: 27 teams from Serie C and the nine Serie D teams started the tournament
 Second round: the eighteen winners from the previous round were joined by the nineteen Serie B teams and three teams from Serie C
 Third round: the twenty winners from the second round met the twelve Serie A sides seeded 9–20
 Fourth round: the sixteen winners faced each other
 Second phase
 Round of 16 (one-legged): the eight fourth round winners were inserted into a bracket with the Serie A clubs seeded 1–8
 Quarter-finals (one-legged)
 Semi-finals (two-legged)
 Final (one-legged)

Round dates
The schedule of each round was as follows:

First stage

First round
A total of 36 teams from Serie C and Serie D competed in this round, eighteen of which advanced to second round. The first round matches were played on 28 and 29 July 2018.

Second round
A total of forty teams from Serie B, Serie C and Serie D competed in the second round, twenty of which advanced to join twelve teams from Serie A in the third round. The second round matches were played on 4, 5 and 7 August 2018.

Third round
A total of 32 teams from Serie A, Serie B and Serie C competed in the third round, sixteen of which advanced to the fourth round. The third round matches were played on 11 and 12 August 2018.

Fourth round
A total of sixteen teams from Serie A, Serie B and Serie C competed in the fourth round, eight of which advanced to the round of 16. The fourth round matches were played on 4, 5 and 6 December 2018.

Final stage

Bracket

Round of 16
Round of 16 matches were played from 12 to 14 January 2019.

Quarter-finals
Quarter-final matches were played from 29 to 31 January 2019.

Semi-finals
The first legs of the semi-finals were played on 26 and 27 February and the second legs on 24 and 25 April 2019.

First leg

Second leg

Final

Top goalscorers

Notes

References

Coppa Italia seasons
Coppa Italia
Italy